Vahdat (formerly: Midenshor), is a village in Gorno-Badakhshan Autonomous Region in south-east Tajikistan. It is the seat of Shughnon District.

References

Populated places in Gorno-Badakhshan